Atholl John Anderson  (born 1943) is a New Zealand archaeologist who has worked extensively in New Zealand and the Pacific. His work is notable for its syntheses of history, biology, ethnography and archaeological evidence. He made a major contribution to the evidence given by the iwi (tribe) Ngāi Tahu to the Waitangi Tribunal.

Early life 
Anderson was born in 1943 in Taranaki and is descended from Ngāi Tahu on Rakiura (Stewart Island). He grew up in Dunedin and Nelson.

Education 
Anderson conducted a survey of archaeological sites in Tasman Bay for his Masters degree in geography from the University of Canterbury which he received in 1966. This masters thesis title was Maori occupation sites in back beach deposits around Tasman Bay. He then completed a Diploma in Teaching and in 1968 became assistant principal of a school in Karamea on the West Coast of the South Island. In 1970 he began an MA in Anthropology at the University of Otago which he completed in 1973 with First Class Honours. His thesis was on the subsistence behaviour at Black Rocks peninsula in Palliser Bay, where he participated in a University of Otago archaeology research project from 1969 to 1972. He received a Commonwealth Scholarship which enabled him to go to Cambridge University where he undertook fieldwork in northern Sweden and completed his PhD thesis, Prehistoric Competition and Economic Change in Northern Sweden, in 1976.

Career 
Anderson took up his first academic position in 1977 at the University of Auckland. The following year he was appointed as an assistant lecturer in the Anthropology Department at the University of Otago, progressing to a personal chair in the department. He left Otago in 1993 to take up the Establishment Chair of Prehistory at the Australian National University in Canberra, Australia.

On his return to Otago in 1978 Anderson commenced a major programme of fieldwork, the Southern Hunters Project, at 20 sites in the south of New Zealand. Important sites were excavated at Pūrākaunui, Lee Island in Lake Te Anau and the Shag River mouth. The focus of many of the excavations was on prehistoric economics, the use of the marine environment and moa hunting. As a result, Anderson examined the chronology of colonisation and re-dated moa hunting sites throughout New Zealand such as at Wairau Bar and Houhora.

After moving to Canberra in 1993 Anderson undertook fieldwork throughout the Pacific as part of two projects, the Indo-Pacific Colonisation Project and the Asian Fore-Arc Project. Themes of his work were the sequence of settlement of the islands of the Pacific, migration, dispersal and voyaging, and sustainability. His other interests in birds, fauna and extinction resulted in an extinct Fijian crocodile, Volia athollandersoni, being named after him.

Anderson followed up his earlier work in southern New Zealand with the Southern Margins Project which commenced in 1998. It showed that Polynesian voyaging into the sub-polar regions (Chatham Islands, Rakiura and Auckland Islands) occurred about 700 years ago.

While he is primarily an archaeologist Anderson has used archaeology, history and ethnography extensively in his work. In an interview about his 1998 book The Welcome of Strangers: an Ethnohistory of Southern Maori AD 1650–1850 he described it as a book that "draws together the disparate sources of information about later southern Māori in an attempt to describe, in some detail, the origins and migrations of the historical peoples, their social and economic organisation, their distribution in the landscape and their responses to the arrival of European culture." In 2015 he collaborated with historians Judith Binney and Aroha Harris to publish Tangata Whenua: a history which won an Ockham New Zealand Book Award in 2016. The authors used environmental science, geology, linguistics, archaeology and history to investigate the migration and settlement of New Zealand.

In addition to his academic work Anderson has served on the New Zealand Historic Places Trust (now Heritage New Zealand) and as an advisor to Te Runanga o Ngāi Tahu. He researched Ngāi Tahu's Treaty of Waitangi claim to the Waitangi Tribunal.

Anderson retired in 2008 to live in the Wairau Valley, Marlborough.

Awards and honours 
 1991 Fellow of the Royal Society of New Zealand
1996 Fellow of the Australian Academy of the Humanities
2001 Federation Medal of Australia for services to archaeology
2002 Fellow of the Society of Antiquaries of London
2002 Doctorate of Science, University of Cambridge
2006 Companion of the New Zealand Order of Merit, for services to anthropology and archaeology, in the 2006 New Year Honours
2015 Humanities Aronui Medal, Royal Society of New Zealand
 2016 Prime Minister's Award for Literary Achievement
2019 Honorary Doctor of Laws, University of Otago

Selected publications 

 Anderson, A., 1983. When all the moa ovens grew cold : nine centuries of changing fortune for the southern Māori. Dunedin [N.Z.]: Otago Heritage Books.
 Anderson, A., 1986. Te Puoho's last raid : the march from Golden Bay to Southland in 1836 and defeat at Tuturau. Dunedin [N.Z.]: Otago Heritage Books.
 Anderson, A., 1989. Prodigious birds : moas and moa-hunting in prehistoric New Zealand. Cambridge: Cambridge University Press. (Reprinted 2003)
 Anderson, A. 1998. The welcome of strangers : an ethnohistory of southern Maori A.D. 1650-1850. Dunedin, N.Z.: Otago University Press.
 Anderson Atholl, Judith Binney & Aroha Harris. 2015. Tangata whenua : a history. Wellington, New Zealand : Bridget Williams Books.

See also
 'Ata– an island at the southern end of the Tongan archipelago
 Moeraki
 Palmerston, New Zealand
 Polynesia

References

External links 

 Archaeological reports by Atholl Anderson on Heritage New Zealand website

Living people
Historians of the Pacific
Historians of Polynesia
20th-century New Zealand historians
New Zealand archaeologists
Fellows of the Royal Society of New Zealand
Academic staff of the University of Otago
University of Otago alumni
University of Canterbury alumni
Alumni of the University of Cambridge
20th-century archaeologists
21st-century archaeologists
1943 births
People from Taranaki
Ngāi Tahu people
Companions of the New Zealand Order of Merit